Mansar (Urdu: مانسر ) is a town in the Chach Valley of Attock District in Punjab Province, Pakistan.

It is located close to bank of the Indus River, and the Azad Kashmir Regiment is located close to this village.

Demographics
Mansar's population is exclusively Muslim, and mostly belong to Awan, Malyaar, Mughal, Shaikh and Pathans.

Shrines
The shrines of the Sufi saint Sin Kalo Baba (سائیں کلو بابا), revered for his piety, and his disciple Sayyad Anwar Shah (سید انور شاہ) are also present in Mansar. There is also a tomb of a disciple of Sayyad Anwar Shah, Bhai Mohammad Alam (بھائی محمد عالم).

References

Villages in Attock District